John Horewode may refer to:

John Horewode (MP for Wells) (died 1417)
John Horewode (MP for Chipping Wycombe) (fl.1421), represented Chipping Wycombe